Spalford is a rural locality in the local government area (LGA) of Central Coast in the North-west and west LGA region of Tasmania. The 2016 census recorded a population of 59 for the state suburb of Spalford.

History 
Spalford was gazetted as a locality in 1962. 

It is believed to have been named for Spalford in England.

Geography
Most boundaries are survey lines.

Road infrastructure 
Route B15 (Castra Road) passes through from north-west to south.

References

Towns in Tasmania
Localities of Central Coast Council (Tasmania)